Stalin Prize may refer to:

 The State Stalin Prize in science and engineering and in arts, awarded 1941 to 1954, later known as the USSR State Prize
 The Stalin Peace Prize, awarded 1949 to 1955, later known as the Lenin Peace Prize